Mario Marcelino is an American actor, possibly best known for his role as Mario Nunouz in the television soap opera Falcon Crest.

He has also appeared in Knight Rider, Airwolf and the film Star Trek III: The Search for Spock.

A 1984 episode, "Race for Life", of Knight Rider was dedicated to his son who died during filming.

Filmography

External links

Year of birth missing (living people)
Living people
American male soap opera actors